Sardas is a locality located in the municipality of Sabiñánigo, in Huesca province, Aragon, Spain. As of 2020, it has a population of 38.

Geography 
Sardas is located 49km north of Huesca.

References

Populated places in the Province of Huesca